Paramilitary groups were formed throughout the Weimar Republic in the wake of Imperial Germany's defeat in World War I and the ensuing German Revolution.  Some were created by political parties to help in recruiting, discipline and in preparation for seizing power.  Some were created before World War I. Others were formed by individuals after the war and were called "Freikorps" (Free corps). The party affiliated groups and others were all outside government control, but the Freikorps units were under government control, supply and pay (usually through army sources).

After World War I, the German Army was restricted to 100,000 men, so there were a great number of Imperial German Army soldiers suddenly de-mobilized. Many of these men were hardened into a Frontgemeinschaft, a front-line community.  It was a spirit of camaraderie that was formed due to the length and horrors of trench warfare of World War I.  These paramilitary groups filled a need for many of these soldiers who suddenly lost their "family"—the army.  Many of those soldiers were filled with angst, anger and frustration over the loss and horror of the war.

Paramilitary groups were quite active in the ill-fated Republic, sometimes used to seize power and other times to quell disturbances.  Freikorps were used in the Baltic region in 1919 by General Rüdiger von der Goltz to protect German interests against Russia.  Other Freikorps members engaged in sabotage acts against French and Belgian occupying forces in the Ruhr in 1923 by blowing up bridges.  Yet other Freikorps orchestrated the Kapp Putsch and the Beer Hall Putsch.  The communists used their groups to seize power in several places in the Weimar Republic at different times, forming Räterepubliken.  Other paramilitary groups were used to quell these uprisings. Freikorps events are displayed in the Weimar Timeline.

The political parties used their paramilitary groups to protect their party gatherings and to disrupt the marches and meetings of their opponents.  Between 1928 and 1932, the Weimar Republic experienced a growth of political violence between these organizations euphemistically called Zusammenstösse (lit. clashes). For instance in 1930, the Nazis claimed 17 fatalities and the communists 44 fatalities in these Zusammenstössen. Scores were injured; in 1930, 2,500 Nazis were injured and in 1932, 9,715.

Freikorps

Freikorps were the brainchild of Major Kurt von Schleicher. The Freikorps were also called the "Black Reichswehr" (Black Army) for they were a 'secret' army outside the bounds of the Versailles Treaty. The idea was developed after the failure of an army unit to quell a small rebellion in Berlin at the Battle of the Schloss. The army unit, when confronted by a socialist group with women and children, threw down their weapons and either ran away or joined the protest group. This led Major von Schleicher to conceive an alternative to using Reichswehr units to quell "red" (socialist or communist) uprisings.  He suggested to his superiors to form volunteer units recruited from the old Reichswehr and commanded by former Imperial officers under governmental control. This way the Reichswehr would avoid the stigma of having to fire on civilians and the government would be financially supporting these freikorps, leaving the Reichswehr to concentrate on training for real battle. Men who joined these units were called "Freebooters", and they often held strong right-wing and nationalist political views. The central Berlin government thought along with the central Reichswehr command that by paying and arming these 'black' soldiers, they might be able 'to tie them to the crib' and thus render them harmless.

The first organizer of a Freikorps unit was General Ludwig Maercker. His unit, the "Maercker Volunteer Rifles", were soon called to rush from city to city stamping out socialist uprisings. Because his unit was called upon to every corner of Germany, he hit upon the idea of forming Einwohnerwehren, local citizen militias to keep the peace. Later on, these groups grew into the Orgesch, (Organization Escherich) reserve militia units for the German Wehrmacht. They were under the command of Dr. Georg Escherich.

Other units were
Freikorps von Lüttwitz named and commanded by General Walther Freiherr von Lüttwitz. This was an umbrella group with the following groups under it:
Potsdam Freikorps with 1,200 veterans
remnants of the Guards Rifle Cavalry Division
Reinhard Freikorps commanded by Colonel Wilhelm Reinhard.
Freikorps Suppe (a separate unit under the Reinhard Freikorps) with 1,500 men
von Roeder's Scouts
Iron Brigade from Kiel
Kuntzel Freikorps
Ostara League
Freikorps Oberland/Bund Oberland
Marinebrigade Ehrhardt. They were the first to use the swastika as a unit symbol. They participated in the Kapp Putsch in 1920.
Viking League (Bund Wiking)

Groups affiliated to political parties
Right-wing
Der Stahlhelm (The Steel helmet, League of front-line Soldiers), officially a veterans' organization, it was the largest organisation stemming from the Freikorps with about 500,000 members. It was led by Theodor Duesterberg and was opposed to the Weimar Republic and politically close to the DNVP and other conservative parties. The Stahlhelm organized an employment service for its unemployed working-class members and a housing program. In 1931, it formed part of the Harzburg Front. In 1934 it was integrated into the SA and in 1935 dissolved.
Deutschvölkischer Schutz und Trutzbund (German Nationalist Protection and Defiance Federation)
Sturmabteilung (SA) (storm troop), affiliated to the Nazi Party. Its leadership was purged by Hitler in the Night of the Long Knives in 1934. One SA section (originally called Stosstrupp) was created as Hitler's personal body guard and would develop into the Schutzstaffel (SS).
Kampfbund (Battle League) was an umbrella group involving NSDAP paramilitary groups, Freikorps Oberland and Bund Reichskriegsflagge (Imperial war flag League) It was created on 30 September 1923 and disbanded after the failed Beer Hall Putsch.
Jungdeutscher Orden, led by Artur Mahraun.  He distanced his group from the Nazis because his group was fundamentally hostile to political parties. In 1930, its political arm merged with the DDP to form the DStP.
Centrists
Eiserne Front (Iron Front) was established in 1931 against the Harzburg Front. It was banned in 1933.
Left-wing
Reichsbanner Schwarz-Rot-Gold (Imperial Banner Black-Red-Gold), devoted to the defense of the Weimar Republic, politically close to the socialist SPD. It was part of the Iron Front meant to counter the right-wing Harzburg Front. In 1933 the organisation was banned.
Roter Frontkämpferbund (Red Front Fighters' League), affiliated with the KPD. It was banned in 1929.
 Antifaschistische Junge Garde (Young Antifascist Guard), banned in 1933, founded by the KPD.
 Kampfbund gegen den Faschismus (Fighting League against Fascism), affiliated with the KPD, also banned in 1933.
 Antifaschistische Aktion, affiliated with the KPD, also banned in 1933.
 Rote Ruhrarmee (Ruhr Red Army) was active during 1920.
Schwarze Scharen (Black Band), affiliated with the FAUD. It was banned in 1933.

Similar organisations also existed in the Republic of Austria, most notably the Schutzbund and the Heimwehr.

See also
Glossary of the Weimar Republic
Weimar political parties
Oskar von Hutier
Organisation Consul

References
Notes

Bibliography

Further reading
Waite, Robert G. L. (1952) Vanguard of Nazism: The Free Corps Movement in Postwar Germany 1918-1923, Cambridge, Massachusetts: Harvard University Press.

 
Military wings of political parties
Reichswehr